Giacomo Vianello (4 June 1947 – 13 January 2022) was an Italian professional footballer who played as a defender for San Donà, Fermana, Ternana, Napoli, Atalanta, Palermo, Livorno and Como. 48 of Vianello's games came in the Serie A.

Vianello was born in Cavallino-Treporti on 4 June 1947. He died on 13 January 2022, at the age of 74.

References

1947 births
2022 deaths
Italian footballers
Association football defenders
S.S.D. Calcio San Donà players
Fermana F.C. players
Ternana Calcio players
S.S.C. Napoli players
Atalanta B.C. players
Palermo F.C. players
U.S. Livorno 1915 players
Como 1907 players
Serie D players
Serie C players
Serie B players
Serie A players
Sportspeople from the Metropolitan City of Venice
Footballers from Veneto